Shwak District is a district of Paktia Province, Afghanistan. The district is within the heartland of the Zadran tribe of Pashtuns. The estimated population in 2019 was 6,138.

References

Districts of Paktia Province